is a sub-kilometer asteroid on an eccentric orbit, classified as a near-Earth object and potentially hazardous asteroid of the Apollo group, approximately 150 meters in diameter. It was discovered on 26 January 2017, by the Space Surveillance Telescope at Lincoln Laboratory's ETS (Atom Site) and passed within 6.6 lunar distances of Earth on 7 February 2017 at 6:36 UT.

Radar imaging 

Its closest approach was observed by NASA's Goldstone Solar System Radar in California's Mojave Desert, determining it to have a number of angular flat surfaces similar to a polyhedral die.

Orbit 

 orbits the Sun with a semi-major axis of 1.95 AU at a distance of 0.9–3.0 AU once every 2 years and 9 months (992 days). Its orbit has an eccentricity of 0.53 and an inclination of 9° with respect to the ecliptic.

Physical characteristics 

Based on an absolute magnitude of 21.4 and an assumed albedo for stony S-type asteroids of 0.20,  measures 156 meters in diameter. The body has a rotation period of 2.15 hours and a brightness amplitude of 0.38 magnitude.

References

External links 
 Meet Asteroid 2017 BQ6 — A Giant, Spinning Brick 12 Feb, 2017 by Bob King
 Asteroid Resembles Dungeons and Dragons Dice February 10, 2017
 Goldstone Radar Observations Planning: comet 45P/Honda-Mrkos-Pajdusakova, 2015 BN509, 2017 BW, 2013 WT67, 2017 BQ6, 2013 FK, and 2017 BY93
 List Of The Potentially Hazardous Asteroids (PHAs)
 Asteroid Detection with the Space Surveillance Telescope 
 
 
 

Minor planet object articles (unnumbered)

20170207
20170126